Rutland-2 Vermont Representative District is a district for the election of members of the Vermont House of Representatives, formed in the redistricting following the 2010 U.S. Census. Rutland-2 assumed its current boundaries for the 2012 election, and previously had a different configuration. It contains the towns of Clarendon, Proctor, Wallingford, West Rutland and a portion of the town of Tinmouth.

Incumbents
For the 2012–14 term the incumbents are (according to the 2013 - 2014 Legislative Session Legislative Directory)
Tom Burditt (Republican)
Dave Potter (Democrat)

References 

U.S. Census Bureau. 2010 Census Interactive Population Search. Web. 28 Aug. 2014.

Vermont Legislature. "2013 - 2014 Legislative Session Legislative Directory". Web. 28 Aug. 2014.

Vermont Legislature. "House District Statistics". 2012. Web.

Vermont Secretary of State. Representative "Redistricting for 2012". 2012. Web.

External links
 Vermont legislature web pages related to reapportionment

Clarendon, Vermont
Proctor, Vermont
Tinmouth, Vermont
Wallingford, Vermont
West Rutland, Vermont